The Girl of the Golden West is a 1938 American musical Western film adapted from the 1905 play of the same name by David Belasco, better known for providing the plot of the opera La fanciulla del West by Giacomo Puccini. A frontier woman falls in love with an outlaw.

Plot summary

Cast
 Jeanette MacDonald as Mary Robbins
 Nelson Eddy as Ramerez
 Walter Pidgeon as Sheriff Jack Rance
 Leo Carrillo as Mosquito
 Buddy Ebsen as Alabama
 Leonard Penn as Pedro
 Priscilla Lawson as Nina Martinez
 Bob Murphy as Sonora Slim
 Olin Howland as Trinidad Joe
 Cliff Edwards as Minstrel Joe
 Billy Bevan as Nick
 Brandon Tynan as The Professor
 H.B. Warner as Father Sienna
 Monty Woolley as The Governor
 Charley Grapewin as Uncle Davy (in prologue)
 Noah Beery Sr. as The General – in prologue (as Noah Beery Sr.)
 Bill Cody Jr. as Gringo (young Ramirez; in prologue)
 Jeanne Ellis as Young Mary Robbins (in prologue)
 Ynez Seabury as Wowkle

Soundtrack
 Sun-Up to Sun Down; Played during the opening credits
 Music by Sigmund Romberg
 Lyrics by Gus Kahn
 Sung by Jeanne Ellis and the pioneers in the prologue
 Shadows On The Moon
 Music by Sigmund Romberg
 Lyrics by Gus Kahn
 Sung by Jeanne Ellis at a campfire in the prologue
 Reprised by Jeanette MacDonald
 Whistled and hummed by Nelson Eddy
 Soldiers Of Fortune
 Music by Sigmund Romberg
 Lyrics by Gus Kahn
 Sung by Noah Beery and his men in the prologue, Bill Cody Jr. (dubbed by Raymond Chace) in the prologue
 Reprised by Nelson Eddy and his men
 The Wind In The Trees
 Music by Sigmund Romberg
 Lyrics by Gus Kahn
 Sung by Jeanette MacDonald
 Played on a fife by Buddy Ebsen
 Gwine to Rune All Night (1850); (De Camptown Races)
 Written by Stephen Foster
 Played as background music in the saloon
 Polly Wolly Doodle
 Lyrics by Gus Kahn
 Played on piano by Brandon Tynan
 Sung by Jeanette MacDonald
 Ave Maria
 Music by Charles Gounod
 Adopted from the First Prelude in The Well-Termpered Clavier
 By Johann Sebastian Bach
 Played on an organ by H.B. Warner
 Sung by Jeanette MacDonald and chorus
 Señorita
 Music by Sigmund Romberg
 Lyrics by Gus Kahn
 Sung by Nelson Eddy and party guests
 Reprised by Jeanette MacDonald and Nelson Eddy
 Mariache
 Music by Sigmund Romberg
 Lyrics by Gus Kahn
 Additional lyrics by Carlos Ruffino
 Translation for Spanish lyrics by Zacharias Yaconelli (uncredited)
 Sung by Jeanette MacDonald, Nelson Eddy and chorus
 Danced to by the party guests
 The West Ain't Wild Anymore
 Music by Sigmund Romberg
 Lyrics by Gus Kahn
 Sung by Buddy Ebsen
 Who Are We To Say
 Music by Sigmund Romberg
 Lyrics by Gus Kahn
 Sung by Nelson Eddy
 Hummed by Jeanette MacDonald
 Reprised on piano by Brandon Tynan and sung by Jeanette MacDonald
 The Wedding March
 from A Midsummer Night's Dream, Op.61
 Written by Felix Mendelssohn-Bartholdy
 Played on a banjo and hummed by Cliff Edwards

Box office
According to MGM records the film earned $2,882,000 resulting in a profit of $243,000.

References

External links
 
 
 
 

1938 films
1938 Western (genre) films
1938 romantic drama films
1930s romantic musical films
American Western (genre) musical films
American black-and-white films
Remakes of American films
American films based on plays
American romantic drama films
American romantic musical films
Films directed by Robert Z. Leonard
Films scored by Herbert Stothart
Metro-Goldwyn-Mayer films
Operetta films
1930s English-language films
1930s American films